Howard Hathaway Aiken (March 8, 1900 – March 14, 1973) was an American physicist and a pioneer in computing, being the original conceptual designer behind IBM's Harvard Mark I computer.

Biography
Aiken studied at the University of Wisconsin–Madison and later obtained his Ph.D. in physics at Harvard University in 1939. During this time, he encountered differential equations that he could only solve numerically. Inspired by Charles Babbage's difference engine, he envisioned an electro-mechanical computing device that could do much of the tedious work for him. This computer was originally called the ASCC (Automatic Sequence Controlled Calculator) and later renamed Harvard Mark I. With engineering, construction, and funding from IBM, the machine was completed and installed at Harvard in February 1944. Richard Milton Bloch, Robert Campbell and Grace Hopper joined the project later as programmers. In 1947, Aiken completed his work on the Harvard Mark II computer. He continued his work on the Mark III and the Harvard Mark IV. The Mark III used some electronic components and the Mark IV was all-electronic. The Mark III and Mark IV used magnetic drum memory and the Mark IV also had magnetic-core memory.

Aiken accumulated honorary degrees at the University of Wisconsin, Wayne State University and Technische Hochschule, Darmstadt. He was elected a Fellow of the American Academy of Arts and Sciences in 1947. He received the University of Wisconsin–Madison College of Engineering Engineers Day Award in 1958, the Harry H. Goode Memorial Award in 1964, the Golden Plate Award of the American Academy of Achievement in 1965, the John Price Wetherill Medal in 1964, and the IEEE (Institute of Electrical and Electronics Engineers) Edison Medal in 1970 "For a meritorious career of pioneering contributions to the development and application of large-scale digital computers and important contributions to education in the digital computer field."

In addition to his work on the Mark series, another important contribution of Aiken's was the introduction of a master's program for computer science at Harvard in 1947, nearly a decade before the programs began to appear in other universities. This became a starting ground to future computer scientists, many of whom did doctoral dissertations under Aiken.

Personal life
Howard Aiken was born to Daniel Aiken and Margaret Emily Mierisch and married three times: to Louise Mancill in June 1937, then later to Agnes Montgomery, and lastly to Mary McFarland. He had two children; Rachel Ann with his first wife, and Elizabeth Betsy with his second.

Howard Aiken was also a Commander in the United States Navy Reserve.

After he retired at age 60 to Fort Lauderdale, Florida, Aiken continued his contributions to technology. He founded Howard Aiken Industries Incorporated, which was a consulting firm that helped failing businesses recover. During his years in Florida, he joined the University of Miami as a Distinguished Professor of Information. In addition, Aiken became a consultant for companies such as Lockheed Martin and Monsanto. On March 14, 1973, Aiken died during a consulting trip to St. Louis, Missouri. His widow, Mary, died in 2013.

See also
 Aiken code

References

External links

 
 
 Father of the computer age
 UW–Madison College of Engineering Engineers' Day 1958 Award Recipients – Howard Aiken
 Oral history interview with Robert Hawkins at Charles Babbage Institute, University of Minnesota, Minneapolis.  Hawkins discusses the Harvard-IBM Mark I project that he worked on at Harvard University as a technician as well as Howard Aiken's leadership of the project.
 Oral history interview with Richard M. Bloch at Charles Babbage Institute, University of Minnesota, Minneapolis.  Bloch describes his work at the Harvard Computation Laboratory for Howard Aiken on the Harvard Mark I.
 Oral history interview with Robert V. D. Campbell at Charles Babbage Institute, University of Minnesota, Minneapolis.  Campbell discusses the contributions of Harvard and IBM to the Harvard Mark I project.
 IEEE Biography

1900 births
1973 deaths
American electrical engineers
United States Navy personnel of World War II
20th-century American physicists
Fellows of the American Academy of Arts and Sciences
Harvard Graduate School of Arts and Sciences alumni
Harvard University faculty
IEEE Edison Medal recipients
University of Miami faculty
University of Wisconsin–Madison alumni
United States Navy officers
20th-century American engineers
[[sourav dey 6:1:2006